Lumeah may refer:
 Lumeah, Queensland, a locality in the Blackall-Tambo Region, Australia
 Lumeah, Western Australia, a town in the Great Southern region